Veuzain-sur-Loire, commonly known as  Veuzain, is a commune in the French department of Loir-et-Cher, administrative region of Centre-Val de Loire. The municipality was established on 1 January 2017 by merger of the former communes of Onzain (the seat) and Veuves.

Veuzain is located about 12.8 miles (20.7 kilometres) southwest of Blois. Onzain station has rail connections to Orléans, Blois and Tours.

See also 
Communes of the Loir-et-Cher department

References 

Communes of Loir-et-Cher